Dame Chance is a surviving 1926 American silent romantic drama film produced and released by independent companies David Hartford Productions and American Cinema Associates respectively. The stars are Julanne Johnston, Robert Frazer, Gertrude Astor, and Mary Carr. Copies of the film are held at the Library of Congress and the BFI British Film Institute.

Cast
Julanne Johnston as Gail Vernon
Gertrude Astor as Nina Carrington
Robert Frazer as Lloyd Mason
David Hartford as Craig Stafford
Lincoln Stedman as Bunny Dean
Mary Carr as Mrs. Vernon
John T. Prince as Sims

References

External links

1926 films
American silent feature films
Films based on short fiction
1926 romantic drama films
American romantic drama films
American black-and-white films
Films directed by Bertram Bracken
1920s American films
Silent romantic drama films
Silent American drama films